Kimilili Constituency is an electoral constituency in Kenya. It is one of nine constituencies in Bungoma County. The constituency was established for the 1988 elections. It is currently represented in parliament by Hon. Didmus Wekesa Barasa, MP. The Official Constituency website is https://kimililiconstituency.go.ke/ , a platform that offers constituents services and information online.

Members of Parliament

Wards

References

Constituencies in Bungoma County
Constituencies of Western Province (Kenya)
1988 establishments in Kenya
Constituencies established in 1988